Dean Creek is a creek primarily on Eglin Air Force Base, near Holley and Navarre, Florida.

References 

Rivers of Florida
Bodies of water of Santa Rosa County, Florida
Navarre, Florida